Lake Mackay, known as Wilkinkarra to the Indigenous Pintupi people, is the largest of hundreds of ephemeral salt lakes scattered throughout the Pilbara and northern parts of the Goldfields-Esperance region of Western Australia and the Northern Territory. It is located within the Great Sandy Desert.

Description
Lake Mackay is the fourth largest lake in Australia. The darker areas of the lakebed are indicative of some form of desert vegetation or algae, some moisture within the soils of the dry lake, and the lowest elevations where pooling of water occurs. In this arid environment, salts and other minerals are carried to the surface through capillary action caused by evaporation, thereby producing the white reflective surface. Visible are various brown hills scattered across the eastern half of the lake and east-west-oriented sand ridges south of the lake.

Known as Wilkinkarra to the local Indigenous population, the lake features prominently in the Aboriginal Dreaming narratives of the Western Desert. The main mythological accounts of its origins can be clustered into three distinct themes, all of which contain references to a fierce bushfire that devastated the land and formed the lake.

Explorer David Carnegie in 1897 predicted the lake's existence when he passed by it to the west as quoted in his book Spinifex and Sand.

It was given its present name after Donald George Mackay.

The lake was the birthplace of prominent Indigenous artist Linda Syddick Napaltjarri, and the area in which artist Ronnie Tjampitjinpa grew up.

Namesakes 

The Northern Territory locality of Lake Mackay, whose boundaries include the lake, was named after it in 2007.

Mackay Lacus, one of the lakes on Saturn's moon Titan, is named after Lake Mackay.

Gallery

See also

 List of lakes of Australia
 Lake Mackay hare-wallaby

References

Lakes of the Pilbara (Western Australia)
Lakes of the Kimberley (Western Australia)
Great Sandy Desert
Mackay, Lake
Saline lakes of the Northern Territory